Antonio González Velázquez (1723–1793) was a Spanish late-Baroque painter.

Biography
Velázquez was born in Madrid into a family of artists; his father Pablo González Velázquez and brothers Alejandro and Luis were all painters. He received a scholarship to travel to Rome in 1747 from the Real Academia de Bellas Artes de San Fernando where he was studying under Corrado Giaquinto. The following year he made the frescoes in the church of Santa Trinita degli Spagnoli.

In 1752 he returned to Spain and a year later helped to paint the walls of the church of the Monastery of the Incarnation of Madrid and the cupola of the chapel of the Basilica del Pilar de Zaragoza. His reputation grew to the point of being appointed court painter in 1757, in which he participated in the decoration of the Royal Palace of Madrid with allegorical painting on the ceiling of the antechamber of the Queen. Not long after, in 1765, Velázquez was promoted to the position of director of the Academy of San Fernando.

He worked the rest of his life along with Francisco Bayeu y Subías and other painters in developing cartons for the Royal Tapestry Factory under the direction of Anton Raphael Mengs. His son Zacarías González Velázquez also went on to become a painter.

References

  José de la Mano, Antonio González Velázquez 
 Cean Bermudez, John Augustine, Historical Dictionary of the most distinguished teachers of the Fine Arts in Spain, Madrid, 1800, vol. 2.
 Scholarly articles in English about Antonio González Velázquez both in web and PDF @ the Spanish Old Masters Gallery

External links

1723 births
1793 deaths
18th-century Spanish painters
18th-century Spanish male artists
Spanish male painters
Spanish Baroque painters
People from Madrid